Mauro Wilney Arambarri Rosa (born 30 September 1995) is a Uruguayan professional footballer who plays as a midfielder for La Liga club Getafe and the Uruguay national team.

Club career

Defensor Sporting 
Arambarri was born in Salto, and joined Defensor Sporting's youth setup in 2011 after impressing in a local youth tournament. He was promoted to the first team in July 2013 by manager Tabaré Silva, and made his professional – and Primera División – debut on 15 September by starting in a 1–0 home win against Fénix.

Arambarri continued to feature regularly for La Viola in the following seasons, and scored his first senior goal on 21 March 2015 by netting the first in a 1–1 home draw against Cerro.

Bordeaux 
On 31 January 2016, Arambarri signed a four-and-a-half-year contract with Ligue 1 side FC Girondins de Bordeaux. He made his debut for the club on 3 February, coming on as a second-half substitute for Valentin Vada in a 3–0 away loss against Olympique Lyonnais.

Arambarri was only rarely used by the club in the 2016–17 campaign, being limited to four league appearances, all from the bench.

Getafe 
On 9 August 2017, after having his federative rights assigned to Boston River, Arambarri signed a one-year loan deal with La Liga club Getafe CF, with a buyout clause, which was activated on 11 June 2018. Arambarri signed a five-year contract.

International career
Arambarri began his international career for Uruguay with under-20 team. He was part of Uruguay squad which finished third at 2015 South American U-20 Championship and reached pre-quarters of 2015 FIFA U-20 World Cup.

On 18 September 2020, Arambarri was included in Uruguay's 26-men preliminary squad for World Cup qualifying matches against Chile and Ecuador. He was later included in the final squad and made his senior debut on 8 October 2020 in Uruguay's 2–1 win against Chile.

Career statistics

Club

International

References

External links 
 
 

1995 births
Living people
Footballers from Salto, Uruguay
Uruguayan footballers
Association football midfielders
Uruguayan Primera División players
Ligue 1 players
La Liga players
Defensor Sporting players
Boston River players
FC Girondins de Bordeaux players
Getafe CF footballers
2015 South American Youth Football Championship players
Uruguay youth international footballers
Uruguay under-20 international footballers
Uruguay international footballers
Uruguayan expatriate footballers
Uruguayan expatriate sportspeople in France
Uruguayan expatriate sportspeople in Spain
Expatriate footballers in France
Expatriate footballers in Spain